Sir George Lawson  was one of two Members of the Parliament of England for the constituency of York on two occasions between 1529-1533 and from 1533-1536

Life and politics
George was born around 1493 to William Lawson of Cramlington  and Anne Horsley of Thernham. In 1516 he married Elizabeth and they had at least two sons, one named George and one daughter name Anne. He was knighted in May 1530.

Throughout his life he held many offices of both the city of York and for the Crown. He was Deputy Captain in the garrison of Berwick-upon-Tweed in 1514. He became a member of the Corpus Christi Guild in 1516 and an alderman from 1527 until his death. He served one term as Lord Mayor of York in 1530  as well as the two terms as MP for the city, sitting with George Gale. He also held the position of cofferer, or treasurer, in the household of Henry FitzRoy, Duke of Richmond and Somerset between 1526 and 1534. He was appointed Justice of the Peace for the East Riding of Yorkshire in 1532-33, the North Riding of Yorkshire in 1536 until his death and for the West Riding of Yorkshire from 1537 also until his death. he was also a member of the Council of the North from 1540.

Between 1513 and 1516, George built a reputation at the garrisons of Berwick-upon-Tweed and Tournai under the commands of Thomas Lord Darcy and William 4th Baron Mountjoy respectively. Having been a royal official helped his rise through the ranks in the city of York and also increased his wealth. George found himself playing the part of intermediary between Thomas Cromwell and Henry Percy, 5th Earl of Northumberland. During the Pilgrimage of Grace, George found himself in a difficult place politically being a government official but sympathizing with the rebels. When the rebels were admitted to the city of York, several lodged with him at his house. He was also reported to have attended the rebel council at Pontefract, but he eventually distanced himself from the movement to declare himself a loyal subject again. His loyalty was rewarded when he was commissioned to repair the castles of Sheriff Hutton, Pontefract, Sandal and Berwick. As religious houses surrendered to the Crown, George acquired the leases to the Whitefriars in Newcastle and the Augustinian priory in York adjacent to his house, converting it into a malting house. Around 1539-40, George bought a twenty one year lease of the Austin Friars in London following its dissolution. George was not beyond criticizing the government where it conflicted with city matters. In 1536 he spoke out against a parliamentary act the enclosed common land on the Knavesmire.

He died in Berwick during a supply run to the garrison in February 1543.

References

Members of the Parliament of England for constituencies in Yorkshire
1493 births
1543 deaths